The third season of the American political drama television series The West Wing aired in the United States on NBC from October 3, 2001 to May 22, 2002 and consisted of 21 episodes and 2 special episodes.

Production 
The season premiere was delayed by the September 11, 2001 terrorist attacks in the United States. When the season did return, the first episode was a special episode titled "Isaac and Ishmael," in which the main cast paid tribute to those affected by the attacks and informed viewers about what to expect from the delayed premiere.

Series creator Aaron Sorkin acknowledged in October 2002 that the terrorism-related plots designed to keep the series relevant after the real-life attacks were awkward at times, saying "from week to week, you felt like you were writing the show handcuffed, a little bit. I didn't know how to write it anymore. It was a constant search for what I wasn't doing that used to make the show work. Maybe there was a way to make it work. There probably was. I wasn't able to find it in twenty-two episodes."

Cast 
The third season had star billing for nine major roles. Eight of these were filled by returning main cast members from the second season. Rob Lowe received star billing, while Martin Sheen received the final credit for his role as President Josiah Bartlet. The rest of the ensemble, now including previously recurring Stockard Channing, were credited alphabetically. Channing was only credited for the episodes in which she appears.

Main cast 
 Rob Lowe as Sam Seaborn, the Deputy Communications Director
 Stockard Channing as Abbey Bartlet, the First Lady
 Dulé Hill as Charlie Young, the Personal Aide to the President
 Allison Janney as C. J. Cregg, the White House Press Secretary 
 Janel Moloney as Donna Moss, the Assistant to the Deputy Chief of Staff
 Richard Schiff as Toby Ziegler, the Communications Director
 John Spencer as Leo McGarry, the White House Chief of Staff
 Bradley Whitford as Josh Lyman, the Deputy Chief of Staff
 Martin Sheen as Josiah Bartlet, the President of the United States

Plot 
The third season, covering the administration's third and fourth years in office, begins with Bartlet announcing his intention to run for re-election and is dominated by the subsequent campaign. Other prominent story lines include a Congressional investigation into allegations Bartlet committed electoral fraud by concealing his MS, a death threat against C.J. and the ensuing relationship she develops with the Secret Service agent assigned to protect her, and Qumari defense minister Abdul Shareef's planning of terrorist attacks against the US. The season finale resolves several of these story lines when Bartlet meets his electoral opponent and reaffirms his commitment to defeat him, finally decides to order Shareef's assassination, and, just minutes after the man who threatened her is arrested, C.J.'s Secret Service agent interrupts a convenience store robbery and is killed.

Episodes 

Note: On the original U.S. Season 3 DVD release (at least), the episode numbers for Season 3 start with "Isaac and Ishmael" as episode 1, and all subsequent episodes numbers are increased by 1 in comparison to this chart.

Specials
Two special episodes, not part of the official continuity, were produced to complement the series and were broadcast on NBC. Both episodes ran within the third season and were included on the season's DVDs.

"Isaac and Ishmael"

Written by series creator Aaron Sorkin and directed by Christopher Misiano, this episode was a terrorism-themed episode produced in the wake of the September 11 attacks. The episode pushed the scheduled season premiere back a week and encouraged viewers to donate to charity—profits from the episode and cast members' weekly pay were also donated. The episode "was written and produced in record time"—less than three weeks—and aired on October 3, 2001.

"Documentary Special"
The second special interspersed the characters' fictional lives with interviews of real West Wing personnel, including Presidents Ford, Carter, and Clinton; press secretaries Marlin Fitzwater and Dee Dee Myers; presidential advisors David Gergen, Paul Begala, and incumbent Karl Rove; Secretary of State Henry Kissinger; Chief of Staff Leon Panetta; presidential personal secretary Betty Currie; and speechwriter Peggy Noonan. The documentary won a Primetime Emmy Award in 2002 for "Outstanding Special Class Program".

Reception

Critical response
On Rotten Tomatoes, the season has an approval rating of 64% with an average score of 10 out of 10 based on 11 reviews. The website's critical consensus reads, "The West Wing still fires off enthralling repartee as if the series' wit was mandated by executive order, but this underwhelming third season finds the series' idealism curdling into a smug self-satisfaction that can't seem to stop wondering why real politics can't be as simple as they are in the fantasy world Aaron Sorkin has crafted."

Accolades
The third season received 21 Emmy Award nominations for the 54th Primetime Emmy Awards, the most-nominated season, winning a total of 4 awards. The series won its third consecutive award for Outstanding Drama Series and Allison Janney also won her third consecutive award, this time in the Outstanding Lead Actress in a Drama Series category. John Spencer and Stockard Channing each won for Outstanding Supporting Actor in a Drama Series and  Outstanding Supporting Actress in a Drama Series, respectively, after being nominated twice before. The season received several acting nominations, which included Martin Sheen for Outstanding Lead Actor in a Drama Series; Dulé Hill, Richard Schiff, and Bradley Whitford for  Outstanding Supporting Actor in a Drama Series; Janel Moloney and Mary-Louise Parker for  Outstanding Supporting Actress in a Drama Series; Mark Harmon, Tim Matheson, and Ron Silver for Outstanding Guest Actor in a Drama Series. Paris Barclay (for "The Indians in the Lobby") and Alex Graves (for "Posse Comitatus") were each nominated for Outstanding Directing for a Drama Series, and Aaron Sorkin was nominated for  Outstanding Writing for a Drama Series (for "Posse Comitatus").

Thomas Del Ruth won an award from the American Society of Cinematographers for the episode "Bartlet for America".

References

General references

External links
 

 
2001 American television seasons
2002 American television seasons
Cultural depictions of Isoroku Yamamoto